Parides echemon is a species of butterfly in the family Papilionidae. It is found in the Neotropical realm.

It is common and not threatened.

Subspecies
P. e. echemon Brazil (Pará)
P. e. ergeteles (Gray, [1853]) Guianas, French Guiana, Surinam, Brazil (Pará)
P. e. empistocles Küppers, 1975 southeastern Peru
P. e. pisander (C. & R. Felder, 1865) French Guiana

Description from Seitz

P. echemon resembles the preceding species [lysander] ; but the forewing is narrower, the outer margin being incurved in the male, straight in the female, the cell of the forewing is narrower at its extremity, the 3. radial of the hindwing is usually much nearer to the 2. radial than to the 1. median, and the fold of the hindwing in the male has no white wool. On the Lower and Middle Amazon and in the Guianas. Two subspecies. — Hubner's figures agree with the form from the Amazon: in the male echemon Hbn. (= echelus Hbn.) the blue-green band of the forewing is narrow and placed, like the white band of the female, separate from the cell. From Para to Santarem. — ergeteles Gray (= echephron Bates, echion Bates, polyphron Fldr.) has in the male a broader blue-green band, and in the female the white spot before the 2. median is contiguous to the cell, or the forewing is without spots.- female f. ergeteles Gray is the form of the female with a white area; in the  female-f. pisander Fldr. the white spots are only indicated by a few white scales. From Obidos to the Rio Negro, north side of the Amazon; Guiana. — Whilst P. lysander is a swamp species and flies heavily over the wettest places in the shade of the woods, P. echemon prefers drier localities in the woods, and is often found on the flowers which hang down from the trees over the narrow paths in the forests.

Description from Rothschild and Jordan (1906) 
A full description is provided by Rothschild, W. and Jordan, K. (1906)

Taxonomy

Parides echemon is a member of the aeneas species group

The members are
Parides aeneas 
Parides aglaope 
Parides burchellanus 
Parides echemon 
Parides eurimedes 
Parides lysander 
Parides neophilus 
Parides orellana 
Parides panthonus 
Parides tros 
Parides zacynthus

References

Butterflies described in 1813
Parides
Papilionidae of South America
Taxa named by Jacob Hübner